Willi Brokmeier (born 8 April 1928) is a German operatic lyric tenor. He focused on operetta roles, with an expressive voice and great acting talent, also appearing in several operetta films. He participated in world premieres and revivals, and performed at major European opera houses. One of his signature roles was Pedrillo in Mozart's Die Entführung aus dem Serail.

Life and career 
Born in Bochum, Brokmeier received his training as a lyric and buffo tenor at the Dortmund Conservatory. He took up his first engagement in 1953 at the Staatstheater Mainz. In 1955, he moved to the Deutsche Oper am Rhein in Düsseldorf, where he remained until 1961. This was followed by an engagement in Munich at the Staatstheater am Gärtnerplatz, when Arno Assmann was artistic director. When Assmann went to the Cologne Opera in 1964, Brokmeier followed him. In 1967, he returned to Munich and became a member of the Bavarian State Opera.

Important roles in Brokmeier's career included David in Wagner's Die Meistersinger von Nürnberg. In the world premiere of Bernd Alois Zimmermann's Die Soldaten in 1965, he appeared as the Count. In 1966, he performed in the first performance of Haydn's Le pescatrici. He appeared in the German premiere of Richard Rodney Bennett's The Mines of Sulphur (Ballade im Moor) in 1967. In 1969, he appeared in the world premiere of Ján Cikker's . In 1976, he participated in Josef Tal's Die Versuchung (The Temptation).

Brokmeier worked with conductors such as Carlos Kleiber, Karl Böhm and Otto Klemperer. He made guest appearances at renowned opera houses in Germany and Europe. He performed at Vienna State Opera in 1958 as Scaramuccio in Ariadne auf Naxos by Richard Strauss, repeating the role the following year at the Maggio Musicale Fiorentino. He performed the role of Jacquino in Beethoven's Fidelio in 1960 on a tour to Japan, repeating it at the Teatro Regio Turin and the Deutsche Oper Berlin. In Vienna, he appeared in 1967 as Pedrillo in Mozart's Die Entführung aus dem Serail, which became one of his signature roles. In 1980, he was awarded the title Bayerischer Kammersänger.

Brokmeier appeared in television film adaptations of operettas, as Prinz Sternschnuppe in Paul Lincke's , as Richard in Leon Jessel's Schwarzwaldmädel, and as Ottokar in Der Zigeunerbaron.

He recorded several complete operettas and excerpt from them, including  Emmerich Kálmán's Gräfin Mariza and Die Csárdásfürstin, and Léhar's Die lustige Witwe and Das Land des Lächelns. He recorded opera roles in Mozart's Le nozze di Figaro and Die Zauberflöte, Schubert's Der vierjährige Posten, Orff's Die Kluge, Korngold's Die tote Stadt, Acanta in Feuersnot by Richard Strauss), and Matteo in Arabella by Richard Strauss from La Fenice in Venice.

Filmography 
 1963: Schneider Wibbel
 1971: Geschichten über Frauen der Geschichte 
 1973: 
 1975: Frau Luna
 1975: Der Zigeunerbaron

References

External links 
 
 
 
 Willi Brokmeier (in German) Tamino Klassikforum''

German operatic tenors
1928 births
Living people
People from Bochum